Thioredoxin is a class of small redox proteins known to be present in all organisms. It plays a role in many important biological processes,  including redox signaling. In humans, thioredoxins are encoded by TXN and TXN2 genes. Loss-of-function mutation of either of the two human thioredoxin genes is lethal at the four-cell stage of the developing embryo. Although not entirely understood, thioredoxin is linked to medicine through their response to reactive oxygen species (ROS). In plants, thioredoxins regulate a spectrum of critical functions, ranging from photosynthesis to growth, flowering and the development and germination of seeds. Thioredoxins play a role in cell-to-cell communication.

Occurrence
They are found in nearly all known organisms and are essential for life in mammals.

Function 
The primary function of Thioredoxin (Trx) is the reduction of oxidized cysteine residues and the cleavage of disulfide bonds. Multiple in vitro substrates for thioredoxin have been identified, including ribonuclease, choriogonadotropins, coagulation factors, glucocorticoid receptor, and insulin. Reduction of insulin is classically used as an activity test. The thioredoxins are maintained in their reduced state by the flavoenzyme thioredoxin reductase, in a NADPH-dependent reaction. Thioredoxins act as electron donors to peroxidases and ribonucleotide reductase. The related glutaredoxins share many of the functions of thioredoxins, but are reduced by glutathione rather than a specific reductase.

Structure and mechanism
Thioredoxin is a 12-kD oxidoreductase protein.  Thioredoxin proteins also have a characteristic tertiary structure termed the thioredoxin fold. The active site contains a dithiols in a CXXC motif. These two cysteines are the key to the ability of thioredoxin to reduce other proteins. 

For Trx1, this process begins by attack of Cys32, one of the residues conserved in the thioredoxin CXXC motif, onto the oxidized group of the substrate. Almost immediately after this event Cys35, the other conserved Cys residue in Trx1, forms a disulfide bond with Cys32, thereby transferring 2 electrons to the substrate which is now in its reduced form. Oxidized Trx1 is then reduced by thioredoxin reductase, which in turn is reduced by NADPH as described above. 

Trx1 can regulate non-redox post-translational modifications. In the mice with cardiac-specific overexpression of Trx1, the proteomics study found that SET and MYND domain-containing protein 1 (SMYD1), a lysine methyltransferase highly expressed in cardiac and other muscle tissues, is also upregulated. This suggests that Trx1 may also play an role in protein methylation via regulating SMYD1 expression, which is independent of its oxidoreductase activity.

Plants have an unusually complex complement of Trx's composed of six well-defined types (Trxs f, m, x, y, h, and o) that reside in diverse cell compartments and function in an array of processes. Thioredoxin proteins move from cell to cell, representing a novel form of cellular communication in plants.

Interactions 

Thioredoxin has been shown to interact with:
 ASK1, 
 Collagen, type I, alpha 1, 
 Glucocorticoid receptor, 
 SENP1,
 TXNIP.
 NF-κB – by reducing a disulfide bond in NF-κB, Trx1 promotes binding of this transcription factor to DNA.
 AP1 via Ref1 – Trx1 indirectly increases the DNA-binding activity of activator protein 1 (AP1) by reducing the DNA repair enzyme redox factor 1 (Ref-1), which in turn reduces AP1 in an example of a redox regulation cascade.
 AMPK – AMPK function in cardiomyocytes is preserved during oxidative stress due to an interaction between AMPK and Trx1. By forming a disulfide bridge between the two proteins, Trx1 prevents the formation and aggregation of oxidized AMPK, thereby allowing AMPK to function normally and participate in signaling cascades.

Effect on cardiac hypertrophy 
Trx1 has been shown to downregulate cardiac hypertrophy, the thickening of the walls of the lower heart chambers, by interactions with several different targets. Trx1 upregulates the transcriptional activity of nuclear respiratory factors 1 and 2 (NRF1 and NRF2) and stimulates the expression of peroxisome proliferator-activated receptor γ coactivator 1-α (PGC-1α). Furthermore, Trx1 reduces two cysteine residues in histone deacetylase 4 (HDAC4), which allows HDAC4 to be imported from the cytosol, where the oxidized form resides, into the nucleus. Once in the nucleus, reduced HDAC4 downregulates the activity of transcription factors such as NFAT that mediate cardiac hypertrophy. Trx 1 also controls microRNA levels in the heart and has been found to inhibit cardiac hypertrophy by upregulating miR-98/let-7. Trx1 can regulate the expression level of SMYD1, thus may indirectly modulate protein methylation for purpose of cardiac protection.

Thioredoxin in skin care 
Thioredoxin is used in skin care products as an antioxidant in conjunction with glutaredoxin and glutathione.

See also 
 RuBisCO - enzyme activity regulated by thioredoxin
 Peroxiredoxin - enzyme activity regulated by thioredoxin
 Thioredoxin fold
 Thioredoxin reductase

References

Further reading

External links 
 
 

Single-pass transmembrane proteins
Moonlighting proteins